Old Bluecoat School, or the St Thomas’ Chapel is a Grade I listed building in the town of Thatcham in the English county of Berkshire. It is located on the main A4 road.

History

St Thomas’ Chapel 
Construction completed and opened for worship in 1304, it was designated by the Bishop of Salisbury as a chapel dedicated St Thomas for the borough of Thatcham. It remained an active chapel until some time in the 16th Century before falling into disuse for another 150 years.

Bluecoat School 
In 1707, the Chapel of St. Thomas was remodeled into a school for poor boys called Winchcombe Charity, in honor of its founder Lady Frances Winchcombe. It earned the name "Bluecoat" from the uniform worn by its students.

References

External links 

Thatcham
Chapels in England
Grade I listed buildings in Berkshire
Thatcham